Walmart Canada is a Canadian retail corporation and the subsidiary of U.S.-based multinational retail conglomerate Walmart. Headquartered in Mississauga, Ontario, it was founded on March 17, 1994, with the purchase of the Woolco Canada chain from the F. W. Woolworth Company.

Originally consisting of discount stores, many of Walmart Canada's contemporaries and competitors include Giant Tiger, Home Hardware, Canadian Tire, Mark's, Sport Chek, GameStop, Dollarama, Winners, HomeSense, Rossy, Staples Canada,  Michaels, Pet Valu, the Great Canadian Dollar Store, Dollar Tree, and Hart Stores. Based on the success of the US format, Walmart Canada has focused on expanding Supercentres from new or converted locations, offering groceries which puts them in the same market as supermarket chains such as Loblaws, Real Canadian Superstore, Atlantic Superstore, Your Independent Grocer, No Frills, Metro, Sobeys, Foodland, Thrifty Foods, Safeway, Save-On-Foods, Country Grocer, Fairway Markets, Quality Foods, Co-op and others. Walmart is the second largest retailer in Canada by revenue.

As of October 31, 2022, Walmart Canada has 402 stores operating, including 343 supercentres and 59 discount stores in almost every province and territory except for Nunavut. Walmart Canada's principal developer and landlord is SmartCentres; other significant landlords include Riocan and First Capital Realty.

It is a participant in the voluntary Scanner Price Accuracy Code managed by the Retail Council of Canada.

History
Walmart Canada was established on January 14, 1994 through the acquisition by Walmart of 122 Canadian leases of Woolco, a troubled subsidiary of Woolworth Canada. The same year, these Woolco stores were renovated and converted into the Walmart banner. Wal-Mart did not acquire 22 other Woolco stores that were either unionized or had downtown locations. Some former Woolco stores were sold and re-opened as Zellers stores.

All 16,000 former employees of the Woolco stores that Walmart acquired were retained, retrained, and given a five percent raise. Mario Pilozzi, a senior vice-president at Woolco when the deal was signed, eventually became CEO of Walmart Canada. Pilozzi, who retired in 2008, has proclaimed that he and "his management team took a limping chain and turned it into the Walmart powerhouse that became a game-changer on the Canadian business scene. Retailers changed, Canadian manufactures faced demands and volumes they had not seen before, real estate transitioned from enclosed malls to big-box plazas". Reflecting on the 1994 deal in 2013, a Walmart Canada spokesman was quoted as saying "Even though Woolco had seen better days and was struggling, there was still an enormous amount of talent in that company. I think that is one of the reasons Walmart has succeeded in Canada, is because we started with a fantastic team that we re-motivated".

Since 1994, many of the shopping centres in which Walmart is located have been developed by SmartCentres (originally known as First Pro), a real estate company founded by Mitchell Goldhar. At present, Smartcentres is the landlord for approximately 100 Walmarts in Canada.

Beginning in the fall of 2006, Walmart opened new Supercentres in Canadian cities. Walmart Canada also operated Sam's Club stores in Ontario from 2003 to 2009. On February 26, 2009, they announced that it would close all six of its Canadian Sam's Club locations. This was part of Walmart Canada's decision to shift focus towards Supercenter stores, but some industry observers suggested that the operation was struggling to compete with Costco and the non-membership Real Canadian Superstore (known as Maxi & Cie in Quebec). Sam's Club also rebranded two unopened locations as new Walmart Supercentres.

From originally taking over much of the Woolco chain, Walmart Canada has expanded and opened new stores. It grew to 260 stores by 2005, making it Canada's second-largest retail chain.

In 2011, Walmart Canada acquired the leases of 39 Zellers stores from Target, originally one of the 189 leaseholds purchased from Hudson's Bay Company and slated for conversion to Target Canada stores. Walmart Canada managed to convert and reopen some of the former Zellers stores before Target Canada's launch. Unlike Walmart's 1994 move into Canada, Walmart Canada this time did not guarantee the jobs of the employees whose stores it was acquiring.

Walmart Canada launched the "Urban 90" format in 2012, a set of smaller Supercentres averaging .

On May 8, 2015, following the bankruptcy of Target Canada, Walmart Canada announced its intent to acquire 13 former Target locations, along with its distribution centre in Cornwall, Ontario subject to court approval. These locations included an unopened location at the Bayshore Shopping Centre in Ottawa.

In September 2018, Walmart Canada began offering same-day delivery at some of its locations through a partnership with Instacart.

On March 15, 2021, Walmart Canada announced that it would close six stores and spend over $500 million to renovate over 60 percent of its stores over the next five years.

Supercentres in Canada

With the success of both Walmart in Canada and Walmart Supercenters in the United States, it was announced in late 2005 that the Supercentre concept would be arriving in Canada. On November 8, 2006, Canada's first three Supercentres opened in Ancaster, London, and Stouffville, all in Ontario. Alberta became the second province with Supercentres in September 2007. The first Supercentre in Vancouver, British Columbia opened in January 2009 in a former Costco/Price Club location, which moved to a new larger site nearby in Burnaby.

Walmart Supercentres stock everything a Walmart Discount Store does, but also include a full-service supermarket, including meat and poultry, baked goods, delicatessen, frozen foods, dairy products, garden produce, and fresh seafood. Many Walmart Supercenters also feature a garden centre, pet shop, Axess Law office, pharmacy, Tire & Lube Express, optical centre, one-hour photo processing lab, portrait studio, a clinic and numerous alcove shops, such as cellular phone stores, hair and nail salons, video rental stores (including Redbox rental kiosks), local bank branches, and fast food outlets, Walmart Canada Bank launched its application for banking licence in 2008 to compete with similar stores in Canada such as Loblaw.

On July 24, 2009, Walmart Canada Bank was incorporated under the Bank Act in Canada. On May 17, 2018, Wal-Mart Canada announced it had reached a definitive agreement to sell Wal-Mart Canada Bank to First National co-founder Stephen Smith and private equity firm Centerbridge Partners, L.P., on undisclosed financial terms. On the purely coincidental date of April 1, 2019, Centerbridge Partners, L.P. and Stephen Smith jointly announced the closing of the previously announced acquisition of Wal-Mart Canada Bank and that it was to be renamed Duo Bank of Canada, to be styled simply as Duo Bank. Though exact ownership percentages were never revealed in either company announcement, it has also since been revealed that Duo Bank was reclassified as a Schedule 1 (domestic, deposit-taking) federally chartered bank of the Bank Act in Canada from the Schedule 2 (foreign-owned or -controlled, deposit-taking) that it had been, which indicates that Stephen Smith, as a noted Canadian businessman, is in a controlling position.

Discount stores in Canada
They carry general merchandise and a selection of dried goods. Many of these stores also have a garden centre, pharmacy, medical clinic, Tire & Lube Express, optical centre, one-hour photo processing lab, cell phone store and fast food outlet, the usual restaurant being McDonald's. Walmart Discount Stores carry limited grocery items, which are limited mostly to dried goods.

Sam's Club (2006–2009)
Walmart Canada operated Sam's Club warehouse clubs in Ontario from 2006 to 2009. On February 26, 2009, they announced that it would close all six of its Canadian Sam's Club locations. Sam's Club also rebranded two unopened locations as new Walmart Supercentres. This was part of Walmart Canada's decision to shift focus towards supercenter stores. Some industry observers suggested that the Canadian Sam's Club never enjoyed the success of its American counterpart due to competition with Costco and the non-membership the Real Canadian Superstore (known as Maxi & Cie in Quebec), as both chains that had a well-established history in Canada while Sam's Club was a late entrant. That same year, Walmart Canada confirmed that it was in discussions with home improvement chain Lowe's to take over five of the six Sam's Club locations.

Corporate

Community involvement
 Raised and donated over $100 million since 1994 to Children's Miracle Network (CMN) to support children's hospitals across Canada.
 Contributed $2.9 million to more than 1,000 local non-profit organizations through Walmart's Local Matching Grant program.
 Raised and contributed $2.8 million for the Breakfast for Learning Canada program, a school nutrition program and partnership with a goal to ensure all school children attend class well nourished and ready to learn.
 Became the top corporate sponsor of the Canadian Red Cross, with $1 million in relief aid related to Hurricane Katrina, the India earthquake and other projects.
 Donated $300,000 to Evergreen, a Canadian non-profit environmental organization to help community groups create and improve green space in urban areas across the country.
 Awarded $115,000 in scholarships to Canadian university and college students.
 Supported 150 Canadian schools through a number of programs including Walmart Canada's Adopt-a School program.

Marketing

Slogans
 Where Everyday Costs Less (1994–1995)
 Always Low Prices. Always Wal-Mart. (1995–1998)
 We Sell For Less Everyday (1998–2009)
 Save Money. Live Better. (2009–present)

Leadership

Controversy

Walmart Canada has been criticized for using low prices to drive out rivals and local businesses. Within ten years of Walmart's entry into Canada, well-established retailer chains such as Zellers, The Bay, and Sears Canada have struggled, with Kmart Canada being sold to Zellers while Eaton's (whom Walmart Canada overtook to become Canada's largest retailer) filed for bankruptcy. The continued difficulties of competing against Walmart Canada eventually led to HBC selling the leases of most Zellers stores to Target Canada, who also went out of business.

In June 2005, Vancouver City Council voted 8–3 to reject Wal-Mart's proposal to build its first store in the city, a  store on Southeast Marine Drive. All eight Coalition of Progressive Electors (COPE) councillors against the project, while Mayor Larry Campbell and Non-Partisan Association (NPA) councillors, Sam Sullivan and Peter Ladner, were in favour. Wal-Mart's proposed store was designed by local architect Peter Busby for sustainable development, with windmills generating power and underground wells heating and cooling the building which would consume 1/3 the energy of a normal store, and it was endorsed by city planners and staffers. Councillor Anne Roberts stated that her opposition was due to potential traffic and congestion that the store would bring to south Vancouver, although she later remarked "I'm not a fan of Wal-Mart, and I've always been concerned about their labour practices, about getting goods from sweatshops".

Labour
Like its American parent, Walmart Canada has been the subject of criticism that it has engaged in practices that discourage associates from exercising their right to join a union and negotiate a collective bargaining agreement.

Walmart Canada has been accused of undermining internet rights and freedom of speech, as a result of its June 2009 decision to seek an injunction against the Walmart Workers Canada campaign and its longstanding Walmart Workers Canada website in particular, a labour rights website sponsored by United Food and Commercial Workers Union Canada (UFCW Canada).

In Saskatchewan, Walmart fought unionization drivers at stores in Weyburn and North Battleford. The company's tactics eventually resulted in the Labour Relations Board imposing a fine and ordering them to hand over relevant documents, including the anti-union handbook for managers.

A Walmart store in Windsor, was unionized in 1997, but workers dissolved the union three years later after it failed to sign contract with management.

The United Food and Commercial Workers Union (UFCW), which had long been unsuccessful in unionizing Walmarts in the United States and much of Canada, was able to take advantage of Quebec's union-friendly laws to make some progress. These laws permit card check organizing, which gives unions more power than secret ballot organizing used in the rest of Canada, and mandates arbitration if the two sides fail to reach a contract. The UFCW argued that union card-signing was more democratic than secret votes because "when there is a vote Walmart uses intimidation tactics". In addition, Quebec's labour relations board had ordered Walmart Canada to stop "intimidating and harassing" cashiers at a store in Sainte-Foy, near Quebec City in the midst of an organizing drive. Walmart has responded, mostly by shutting down unionized stores or stalling labour contract negotiations. For instance they closed their Saguenay, Quebec store, in April 2005 after workers unionized and just days before contract settlement by binding arbitration, putting 190 employees out of work. Walmart argued that the store was not profitable and the Supreme Court of Canada affirmed 6–3 on November 27, 2009, that the company had the legal right to close the store. Walmart also closed its automotive centre in Gatineau, Quebec, after employees unionized and an arbitrator imposed a 33% wage increase.

There was the successful unionization by the UFCW of a Walmart store in Jonquière, Quebec in August 2004, as told in the documentary Wal-Mart: The High Cost of Low Price. The initial card check organizing efforts fell one vote short, and in April 2004 a secret ballot to join the union was defeated 53% to 47%. However, when a group of managers gathered just outside the front door to celebrate for the TV cameras and taunt union supporters as they left the store, this spectacle offended many of the workers that originally voted against the union and caused them to switch sides, leading to a second and successful card check that unionized the store in August 2004. However, nine days of negotiation between the UFCW and Wal-Mart were fruitless, with the union accusing the company of not negotiating in good faith while Walmart argued that the union wanted the store to hire an additional 30 workers. Walmart closed the store five months later because the company did not approve of the new "business plan" a union would require, and this move was permitted by Quebec law as long as the closure was permanent.

This labour dispute between Walmart and the UFCW made headlines worldwide; three of the other forty-six Walmarts in the province of Quebec were temporarily closed by bomb threats, while a TV broadcaster likened Wal-Mart to Nazi Germany, and Saguenay mayor Jean Tremblay denounced the company as a "freebooting scofflaw". Walmart CEO H. Lee Scott Jr. argued that the Jonquière store was struggling, while polls in Canada showed that 9 of 10 Canadians believed that the store closure was mainly due to the unionization. A local newspaper columnist accused the UFCW leaders in Washington, D.C., of using the Jonquière store workers (in a city with chronically high unemployment, and whose stores had been wiped out by the opening of the Place du Royaume shopping mall in Chicoutimi) as "cannon fodder" to provoke a fight in order to incite public opinion against the Walmart, knowing that Walmart headquarters would not tolerate a unionized store. In September 2005, the Quebec Labour Board ruled that the closing of a Walmart store amounted to a reprisal against unionized workers and has ordered additional hearings on possible compensation for the employees, though it offered no details. Union organizers suggested that Walmart was making an example of the Jonquière store to pressure workers at other locations not to unionize.

At the Saint-Hyacinthe, Quebec Walmart, the 200 employees had organized successfully in January 2005 but contract negotiations stalled and an arbitrator was called in, finally reaching a two-year deal on April 9, 2009. However the Saint-Hyacinthe contract was seen largely as a Pyrrhic victory for the UFCW, as the arbitrator portrayed "Walmart as at least as good an employer-even a superior employer- compared with other retailers", noting that Walmart workers were paid more than their counterparts at Zellers. The union's calls for wage and benefit increases were all rejected, particularly their demand for an automatic-progression annual wage scales, as that would have conflicted with the company-wide annual performance evaluation, a key component of Walmart's business model. The arbitrator awarded existing workers (but not new hires) a small wage gain of 30¢ an hour to prevent them from being "impoverished" by dues paid to a union that failed to justify wages increases to the arbitrator. In 2011, the Saint-Hyacinthe Walmart employees voted (147 out of 250) to decertify United Food and Commercial Workers as their representative union; it has been suggested that employees were disappointed in their union whose 2009 contract was tilted strongly in favour of their employer.

Walmart employees in Gatineau, Quebec joined the United Food and Commercial Workers Union (UFCW) in 2008. This was followed by two years of stalled negotiations before an arbitrator imposed a collective agreement. In November 2011, after one year with their first collective agreement, the 150 Wal-Mart employees voted to decertify.

On August 15, 2013, the Supreme Court of Canada cleared the way for Walmart employees in Weyburn, Saskatchewan who voted 51–5 to decertify United Food and Commercial Workers as their representative union. This left no unionized Wal-Mart stores in the whole of Canada.

Security
On July 14, 2015 Walmart Canada disabled their online photo site, blaming a third party vendor, believed to be PNI Digital Media. Walmart's shutdown was followed shortly after by other companies suspending their photo site whilst an investigation took place. In common with other potential victims there was no confirmation or denial about whether hackers had stolen customer photographs as well as data and payment information.

Walmart Canada interiors

References

External links

 Official website

1994 establishments in Ontario
Canadian subsidiaries of foreign companies
Companies based in Mississauga
Canadian brands
Department stores of Canada
Discount stores of Canada
Retail companies established in 1994
Supermarkets of Canada
Walmart
Canadian companies established in 1994
Toy retailers of Canada